Nobleza baturra (The Nobility of the Peasantry, also known as Aragonese Virtue) is a 1935 Spanish musical drama film directed by Florián Rey, and starring Imperio Argentina, Miguel Ligero Rodríguez, and Juan de Orduña. It is based on the play of the same name by Joaquín Dicenta. The film was a phenomenal success, and was one of the most commercially successful films of the Second Republic. The film was produced by CIFESA at CEA Studios. It was noted for its sentimental view of rural people, and its folklorish characters.

Plot
In Aragon in the early twentieth century, María del Pilar, an honest girl, is affected when a former suitor, out of spite of being rejected, publicises throughout the village that she had engaged in extramarital sex. This rumour soon spreads throughout the region.

Cast
Imperio Argentina as María del Pilar
Miguel Ligero Rodríguez as Perico
Juan de Orduña as Sebastián
José Calle as Tío Eusebio
Manuel Luna as Marco
Carmen de Lucio as Filomena
Pilar Muñoz as Andrea
Juan Espantaleón as Padre Juanico
Blanca Pozas as Doña Paula

References

External links

1930s musical drama films
Films set in Aragon
Films directed by Florián Rey
Spanish black-and-white films
Spanish musical drama films
1930s Spanish-language films